The 2022 La Flèche Wallonne Féminine was a Belgian road cycling one-day race that took place on 20 April 2022. It was the 25th edition of La Flèche Wallonne Féminine and the 9th event of the 2022 UCI Women's World Tour. Italian Marta Cavalli won the race for the first time.

Route 
The race started and finished in Huy, with the finish line on the top of the final ascent of the Mur de Huy - one of three ascents of the Mur on the route. The race covered the same final 90km as the men's race, totalling 130.2 km. There were 8 categorised climbs:
65 km: Côte de Cherave - 1.5 km climb at 7.6%
71 km: Mur de Huy - 1.3 km climb at 9.6%
84 km: Côte d'Ereffe - 2.1 km climb at 4.6%
96.5 km: Côte de Cherave - 1.5 km climb at 7.6%
102 km: Mur de Huy - 1.3 km climb at 9.6%
111.1 km: Côte d'Ereffe - 2.1 km climb at 4.6%
127.5 km: Côte de Cherave - 1.5 km climb at 7.6%
133.4 km: Mur de Huy - 1.3 km climb at 9.4%

Summary 
Seven-time winner of La Flèche Wallonne Féminine Anna van der Breggen retired from the sport at the end of 2021 and therefore did not defend her 2021 title.

In the race itself, a large breakaway of 15 riders was caught before the bottom of the final ascent of the Mur de Huy. On the climb, Annemiek van Vleuten of  attacked with 400m to go on the steepest section of the ascent.

Result

See also
 2022 in women's road cycling

References

La Fleche Wallonne Feminine
La Flèche Wallonne Feminine
La Fleche Wallonne Feminine
La Flèche Wallonne Féminine